Paula A. Stark is an author, American politician and member of the Florida House of Representatives for the 47th district. She was first elected to office on November 8, 2022.

Early life and education 
Paula Stark was born in Dothan, Alabama. The former Miss OHS graduated from Osceola High School in Kissimmee Florida and attended Florida Technological University.

Career 
In 2022 Stark filed to run for Florida state house representative for district 47 and won election in November of that year.

Since 2012, Stark has been the executive director of St. Cloud Main Street.

Paula Stark was publisher of the Osceola News Gazette and retired after 29 years in 2012.

Affiliations 
City of St. Cloud Economic Advisory Council

City of St. Cloud Historic Preservation Board

Kissimmee/Osceola County Chamber of Commerce

Osceola Center for the Arts

Osceola County YMCA

Senior Little League World Series

St. Cloud Business Group

Downtown Business Group

St. Cloud Chamber of Commerce

St. Cloud Economic Stimulus Grant Committee

St. Cloud Main Street

Highlights & Awards 
Sun Media (Toronto, Canada), 8 John S Grant Advertising Marketing Awards

St. Cloud Chamber of Commerce Living Legend Award

Florida Press Association Account Executive of the Month, 2001

St. Cloud Rotary, Business Person of the Year, 1999

Employee of the Year, 1993

St. Cloud Chamber of Commerce Business Person of the Year 2011

St. Cloud Main Street Legend

Sponsored Florida House Bills 2023 
HB 499 - Florida Main Street Program and Historic Preservation Tax Credits

HB 751 - Mobile and Manufactured Homes

HB 753 - Sentencing for Trafficking Violations

HB 847 - Floating Vessel Platforms and Floating Boat Lifts

HB 1039 - Missing Persons

HB 1051 - Use and Access of Public Restrooms

Co Sponsored Florida House Bills 2023 
HB 239 - Special Risk Class Retirement Date

HB 251 - Entertainment Industry Tax Credit Program

HB 333 - Transfer of K-12 Grades and Credits

HB 533 - Fair Repair of Agricultural Equipment

HB 553 - State Recognition of Indian Tribes and Bands

HB 563 - Applications on Government Devices

HB 569 - Pretrial Detention

HB 605 - Expunction of Criminal History Records

HB 965 - Driver License, Identification Card, and Motor Vehicle Registration Applications

References 

Florida politicians

Year of birth missing (living people)
Living people